The Canal de Chelles (Or Canal Vaires in Neuilly-sur-Marne) is a channel parallel to the Marne River. It connects the Marne River in Neuilly-sur-Marne to the Marne River in Vaires-sur-Marne.

Construction began in 1848 when the government of the young Second Republic created the National Workshops to employ the unemployed. The work was abandoned shortly after due to lack of funding. It was started anew under Second Empire. The canal was opened in 1865.

See also
 List of canals in France

References

Canals in France
Canals opened in 1865